Cassar may refer to:

Cassar, a Maltese surname

People with the surname Cassar:
Antoine Cassar, Maltese poet and translator
Antonio Cassar-Torreggiani
Brian Cassar, British singer, better known as Casey Jones
Eleanor Cassar, Maltese singer
Georgina Cassar, Gibraltarian rhythmic gymnast
Girolamo Cassar, Maltese architect and military engineer
Harrison Cassar, Australian judoka
Jeff Cassar, American soccer goalkeeper
Joe Cassar, Maltese politician
Jon Cassar, Maltese-Canadian television director and producer
Matthew Cassar, Australian cricketer
Troy Cassar-Daley, country musician

See also
Kassar